The 2010 Tour du Haut Var was the 42nd edition of the Tour du Haut Var cycle race and was held on 20–21 February 2010. The race started in La Croix-Valmer and finished in Montauroux. The race was won by Christophe Le Mével.

General classification

References

2010
2010 in road cycling
2010 in French sport